The Continental Cup 2004–05 was the eighth edition of the IIHF Continental Cup. The season started on September 24, 2004, and finished on January 9, 2005.

The tournament was won by HKm Zvolen, who led the final group.

Preliminary round

Group A
(Miercurea Ciuc, Romania)

Group A standings *

*:  Steaua București was disqualified

Group B
(Zagreb, Croatia)

Group B standings

First Group Stage

Group C
(Riga, Latvia)

Group C standings

Group D
(Amiens, France)

Group D standings

Group E
(Oświęcim, Poland)

Group E standings

 Storhamar Dragons     :  bye

Second Group Stage

Group F
(Hamar, Norway)

Group F standings

 Alba Volán Székesfehérvár,
 HKm Zvolen,
 Dynamo Moscow     :  bye

Final stage

Final Group
(Székesfehérvár, Hungary)

Final Group standings

References
 Continental Cup 2005

2004–05 in European ice hockey
IIHF Continental Cup